Alimamy Pallo Bangura is a politician in Sierra Leone. Over the past 12 years, Bangura has played a major role in Sierra Leonean politics and was a member of the Revolutionary United Front Party, where he replaced rebel leader Foday Sankoh following Sankoh's May 2000 arrest and 2002 electoral disqualification. His posts have included: Ambassador to the United Nations from Sierra Leone (1994–1996); Foreign Minister (1997–1998); Minister of Energy and Power (1999–2001); and Secretary General of the Revolutionary United Front Party (2002–2007). He also ran for president in 2002 alongside former cabinet minister Peter Vandy, but the pair only received 1.7% of the presidential vote, while the RUF received only 2.2% of the parliamentary vote.

Education
Bangura holds a master's degree from the School of Oriental and African Studies, University of London.

Political beliefs
The RUF was made famous for its brutal war tactics that included kidnapping and torture. However, Bangura sought to change the face of the party. He describes himself as a supporter of democracy and a Christian. He has said "I'm not one who looks down on anybody. I do not reject anybody. I do not condemn anybody. The kind of Christian that I am is to accept everybody as God's child, and God having a purpose for each one. That is how I see it."

External links
 Interview with Bangura
 BBC profile of Bangura

Year of birth missing (living people)
Living people
Sierra Leonean diplomats
Alumni of SOAS University of London
Temne people
Revolutionary United Front politicians
Foreign Ministers of Sierra Leone
20th-century Sierra Leonean politicians
21st-century Sierra Leonean politicians